Three Steps to Heaven is an American soap opera that aired on NBC from August 3, 1953 to December 31, 1954. It was created by Irving Vendig. Don Pardo was the announcer.  One of the directors was Gordon Rigsby.

Synopsis
The show followed Mary Claire 'Pogo' Thurmond, who moved to New York City in hopes of becoming a successful model.

The program was partially sponsored by Procter & Gamble, its commercials alternating between Tuesday, Wednesday, and Friday of one week and Tuesday and Friday of the next week.

Cast
Kathleen Maguire, Phyllis Hill and Diana Douglas as Poco Thurmond
Mark Roberts and Walter Brooks as Bill Morgan
Ginger McManus as Angela
Lori March as Jennifer
Joe Brown Jr. as Mike
Mona Burns as Charlotte Doane 
Laurie Vendig as Alice
Doris Rich as Mrs. Doane
Roger Sullivan as Barry Thurmond
Inge Adams as Laura
Frank Twedell as Uncle Frank
Eata Linden as Pigeon Malloy
Earl George as Walter Jones
Beth Douglas as Nan
John Marley as Vince Bannister
Dort Clark as Alan Anderson

References

External links 
 

1953 American television series debuts
1954 American television series endings
American television soap operas
Black-and-white American television shows
English-language television shows
NBC original programming